Galaksija BASIC was the BASIC interpreter of the Galaksija build-it-yourself home computer from Yugoslavia. While being partially based on code taken from TRS-80 Level 1 BASIC, which the creator believed to have been a Microsoft BASIC, the extensive modifications of Galaksija BASIC—such as to include rudimentary array support, video generation code (as the CPU itself did it in absence of dedicated video circuitry) and generally improvements to the programming language—is said to have left not much more than flow-control and floating point code remaining from the original.

The core implementation of the interpreter was fully contained in the 4 KiB ROM "A" or "1". The computer's original mainboard had a reserved slot for an extension ROM "B" or "2" that added more commands and features such as a built-in Zilog Z80 assembler.

ROM "A"/"1" symbols and keywords

The core implementation, in ROM "A" or "1", contained 3 special symbols and 32 keywords:
   begins a comment (equivalent of standard BASIC REM command)
   Equivalent of standard BASIC DATA statement
   prefix for hex numbers
   Allocates an array of strings, like DIM, but can allocate only array with name A$
   serves as PEEK when used as a function (e.g. PRINT BYTE(11123)) and POKE when used as a command (e.g. BYTE 11123,123).
   Calls BASIC subroutine as GOSUB in most other BASICs (e.g. CALL 100+4*X)
   converts an ASCII numeric code into a corresponding character (string)
   draws (command) or inspects (function) a pixel at given coordinates (0<=x<=63, 0<=y<=47).
   displays the clock or time controlled by content of Y$ variable. Not in standard ROM
   causes specified program line to be edited
   standard part of IF-ELSE construct (Galaksija did not use THEN)
   compare alphanumeric values X$ and Y$
   standard FOR loop
   standard GOTO command
   equivalent of standard BASIC CLS command - clears the screen
   protects n characters from the top of the screen from being scrolled away
   standard part of IF-ELSE construct (Galaksija did not use THEN)
   user entry of variable
   a function that returns the greatest integer value equal to or lesser than n
   test whether a particular keyboard key is pressed
   lists the program. Optional numeric argument specifies the first line number to begin listing with.
   returns memory consumption data (need details here)
   clears the current BASIC program
   clears BASIC program and moves beginning of BASIC area
   standard terminator of FOR loop
   loads a program from tape
   loads program to different address
   Returns address of the variable
   Printing numeric or string expression.
   Return from BASIC subroutine
   function (takes no arguments) that returns a random number between 0 and 1.
   runs (executes) BASIC program. Optional numeric argument specifies the line number to begin execution with.
   saves a program to tape. Optional two arguments specify memory range to be saved (need details here).
   standard part of FOR loop
   stops execution of BASIC program
   replacement for READ and RESTORE. If the parameter is variable name, acts as READ, if it is number, acts as RESTORE
   "undraws" (resets) at specified coordinates (see DOT)
   Stops the clock, not part of ROM
   Calls machine code subroutine
   Double byte PEEK and POKE

ROM "B"/"2" additional symbols and keywords

The extended BASIC features, in ROM "B" or "2", contained one extra reserved symbol and 22 extra keywords:

See also
 Voja Antonić, creator of Galaksija and this BASIC

References

External links
 Uputstvo za upotrebu, user manual online, complete, original, in Serbian language

Microsoft BASIC
Programming tools
Galaksija (computer)
BASIC interpreters